Once means a one-time occurrence.

Once may refer to:

Music 
 Once (Pearl Jam song), a 1991 song from the album Ten
 Once (Roy Harper album), a 1990 album by Roy Harper
 Once (The Tyde album), a 2001 debut album by The Tyde
 Once (Nightwish album), the fifth studio album by Finnish symphonic metal band Nightwish, released on June 7, 2004
 Once (Diana Vickers song), a 2010 single from her album Songs from the Tainted Cherry Tree
 Once, a song by Shane Filan from 2013 album You and Me
 Once, a song by Liam Gallagher from the 2019 album Why Me? Why Not
 Once (singer) (born 1970), stage name of Indonesian singer and former lead vocalist of Elfonda Mekel
 The Once, a Canadian folk trio
 Once, a fandom name for the South Korean girl group Twice

Places 
 Once Brewed, a village in Northumberland, England
 Once de Octubre, a village and municipality in Neuquén Province in southwestern Argentina
 Once de Septiembre, a town in Buenos Aires Province, Argentina

Other uses 
 Canal Once, a Mexican public television network
 Once (film), a 2007 musical film written and directed by John Carney
 Once (musical), a 2011 musical stage adaptation based on the film
 Once (novel),a 2005 children fiction by Morris Gleitzman
 ONCE, the National Organization of the Spanish Blind
 ONCE cycling team, a Spanish professional cycling team from 1989 to 2006
 ONCE Group, an artists' collective that sponsored a music festival in Ann Arbor, Michigan between 1961 and 1966
 Balvanera, a neighbourhood in Buenos Aires, Argentina, named after Plaza Once de Setiembre, the alternative name of Plaza Miserere (the square in which president Bernardino Rivadavia's mausoleum is located)
 Once railway station, IPA: [ˈonse]) is a large railway terminus in central Buenos Aires, Argentina
 Once (Buenos Aires Metro), a station on Line H of the Buenos Aires Metro located at the intersection of Pueyrredón and Rivadavia avenues in the neighbourhood of Balvanera
 El Once, an alternate name for the 1973 Chilean coup d'état
 Once Lobos, a professional Salvadoran football club based in Chalchuapa, Santa Ana, El Salvador